Squabble Creek is a stream in Perry County, Kentucky, in the United States.

Squabble Creek was so named from a dispute about a deer.

See also
List of rivers of Kentucky

References

Rivers of Perry County, Kentucky
Rivers of Kentucky